The 48th Army Corps was an Army corps in the Imperial Russian Army.

Part of
9th Army: 1916-1917

Reference 

Corps of the Russian Empire